Gabriela Chávez may refer to:

 Gabriela Chávez (footballer) (born 1989), Argentine footballer
 Gabriela Chávez (volleyball) (born 1994), Mexican volleyball player